Guangzhou Auto may refer to:

 Auto Guangzhou (auto show)
 Guangzhou Automobile (auto manufacturer)